Cora Emmanuel (born 1 October 1992) is a French fashion model.

Early life
Her father is a former architect and current architecture teacher; her mother is a history and geography teacher. She has an older sister and younger half-brother.

Career
Emmanuel's mother encouraged her to do the Elite Model Look contest and she signed with Elite Model Management in 2008. She moved to New York City where she signed with New York Models. In 2011, she signed with Ford Models, her current agency. After having switched to Ford, she walked for Alexander Wang, Tommy Hilfiger, Michael Kors, Kenzo, Elie Saab, Akris and Bottega Veneta (which she opened and closed). She has also walked for Valentino, Givenchy, Miu Miu, Louis Vuitton, Mugler, Jean Paul Gaultier, Stella McCartney, Marni, Dolce & Gabbana and Chanel, for whom she did a campaign. She has also walked for Diane von Furstenberg, Donna Karen, Vera Wang, Jason Wu, and Tory Burch.

Emmanuel has been on the cover of H&M magazine, Elle Sweden, Elle Norway, Elle France, and Vogue Mexico. And has appeared in magazines including CR Fashion Book, Allure, Glamour, Vogue Paris, Vogue Italia, and Elle.

She has done ads for Sephora, Tiffany & Co., Tommy Hilfiger, Balmain, and NARS Cosmetics.

Emmanuel was ranked on models.com's "Money Girl" and "Top 50 Models" lists.

References

1992 births
Living people
Martiniquais female models
French people of Martiniquais descent
Ford Models models
French expatriates in the United States
French female models
The Society Management models
French people of Nigerian descent
French people of British descent